Nephopterix hemibaphes is a species of snout moth in the genus Nephopterix. It was described by Alfred Jefferis Turner in 1905, and is known from Australia, including Tasmania.

References

Moths described in 1905
Phycitini